
The British Rail Class 48 was a diesel locomotive class which consisted of five examples, built at Brush Falcon Works in Loughborough and delivered between September 1965 and July 1966. They were part of the British Rail Class 47 order, but differed from their classmates by being fitted with a Sulzer V12 12LVA24 power unit producing , as opposed to the standard 12LDA28C twin-bank twelve-cylinder unit of the remaining fleet.

In service 
The locomotives, numbered in the D1702-D1706 series, mainly worked from Tinsley depot in Sheffield on both passenger and freight work. In 1969, they moved to Norwich depot where they worked on express trains between there and London Liverpool Street. The 12LVA24 engine, however, was found to be unreliable and the locomotives spent more time out of service than their standard counterparts. Engine failures were common and repairs were often expensive. After conversion to Class 47s, they moved to Stratford depot, in East London, until they were displaced by examples fitted with electric train heating equipment. Subsequently, the batch went their separate ways to several depots.

Rebuilding 
Eventually, it was decided not to continue with the 12LVA24 experiment; the engines were removed and the locomotives were fitted with the standard 12LDA28 engines. D1702 was the first to be so treated at Crewe Works, using parts from D1908 which had been withdrawn after a serious accident; it emerged back into service in December 1969. All five locomotives had been so converted by early 1971 and then became standard Class 47s. The power units were sold to SNCF and used in their Class A1AA1A 68000 locomotives.

Further service and preservation 

The locomotives continued in service for many years afterwards and were renumbered 47114-47118 to conform with British Rail's TOPS system in the early 1970s. Four of the locomotives were withdrawn from service between December 1990 and January 1991 with the remaining locomotive, 47 114, being sidelined in 2002. Engine 47 117 (D1705) was subsequently bought for preservation by rail enthusiast and pop music producer Pete Waterman. It is now owned by the Type 1 Locomotive Association and works on the private Great Central Railway.  At the GCR, it has been restored to BR two-tone green livery with its pre-TOPS number D1705, though it retains its Class 47 engine. It has also been named Sparrowhawk in the tradition of Brush Works policy of naming locomotives after birds of prey (qv Kestrel, Falcon, etc.), though it never carried this name in service. The other four locomotives have since been scrapped.

References

Sources

External links 
 A photograph of D1705 as a Class 48 in 1969.

48
Brush Traction locomotives
Railway locomotives introduced in 1965
Co-Co locomotives
Standard gauge locomotives of Great Britain
Diesel-electric locomotives of Great Britain